Jaya Guhanathan is an Indian actress of Tamil and Malayalam films. She acted for a decade. She has acted almost 100 films in variety of roles.

Personal life
Jaya and V. C. Guhanathan fell in love with each other during the filming of their film, eventually got married at Arulmigu Devi Karumari Amman Temple, Tiruverkadu, Tiruvallur district. Jaya speaks Tamil fluently.

Film career
While furthering her studies in PUC at S.I.E.T college, Chennai, she was persuaded by V. C. Guhanathan to join films.In 1971, she was introduced in Tamil film Sudarum Sooravaliyum opposite Gemini Ganesan, R. Muthuraman and Chandra Mohan. She decided to quit acting on 1980, her last movie was Aarilirunthu Arubathu Varai.

Partial filmography

Tamil

Malayalam: Credited as Junior Sheela
 Ashwamedham (1967)
 Anweshichu Kandethiyilla (1967)
 Detective 909 Keralathil (1970)
 Oru Penninte Katha (1971) as Sreedevi
 Aabhijathyam (1971)
 Thettu (1971)...Mini
 Miss Mary (1972)
 Panitheeratha Veedu (1973) as Jose's sister
 Bhaaryaye Aavashyamundu (1975)
 Rajayogam (1976)
 Tholkan Enikku Manassilla (1977)
 Guruvayur Kesavan (1977)
 Eeta (1978)

References 

20th-century Indian actresses
20th-century Sri Lankan actresses
Actresses in Malayalam cinema
Actresses in Tamil cinema
Indian film actresses
Living people
Year of birth missing (living people)